Charles Neal Arnold (May 18, 1880 – October 28, 1929) was Mayor of Honolulu from January 2, 1927, to January 1, 1929. He was a Republican.

Background

He was born in ʻŌʻōkala, Kingdom of Hawai'i of part Native Hawaiian and part European descent. ʻŌʻōkala is an unincorporated community near Hilo. The family relocated to Honolulu, and he worked temporarily for the Honolulu Bicycle, the California Feed Company. His long-term career spanned 27 years with the Honolulu Plantation Company in Aiea, Hawaii.  He served on the Board of Supervisors of Oʻahu County, a governing body created during the Territory of Hawaii. He retired from the sugar plantation only after he became Mayor of Honolulu.

During World War I, he joined the military.  He was stationed in Aiea, Schofield Barracks and Fort Armstrong. World War I ended November 11, 1918, and Arnold received an honorable discharge on February 3, 1919.

Personal life

Arnold was married twice and had 12 children.  He had 6 children with Charlotte K. Taylor who died in 1916. Children by that marriage were Charles Jr., Alfred, William, Cecelia, Lillian Louise and Arthur. In 1918, he married Julia Kanaana Colburn, daughter of John F. Colburn and Julia Naoho.  Together, they also had 6 children - Shafter, June,  Alice, Yvonne, Francis and Thomas.

References

Mayors of Honolulu
1880 births
1929 deaths
Hawaii Republicans
20th-century American politicians
People from Hawaii (island)
Military personnel from Hawaii
Burials at Oahu Cemetery
Native Hawaiian politicians
American people of Native Hawaiian descent
American military personnel of Native Hawaiian descent